The New York University Department of Philosophy is ranked 1st in the US and 1st in the English-speaking world as of the most recent edition of the Philosophical Gourmet Report from 2021 (as well as in the 2017, 2014, 2011, 2009, and 2006 editions). It is also ranked 1st in the world by the 2022 QS World University Rankings, and is internationally renowned. It has particular strengths in epistemology, history of philosophy, logic, metaphysics, moral and political philosophy, philosophy of language, philosophy of logic and philosophy of mathematics, and philosophy of mind. The department offers B.A., M.A., and Ph.D. degrees in philosophy, as well as a minor in philosophy and a joint major in language and mind with the NYU Departments of Linguistics and Psychology. It is home to the New York Institute of Philosophy, a research center that supports multi-year projects, public lectures, conferences, and workshops in the field, as well as outreach programs to teach New York City high school students interested in philosophy.

The faculty and students have close relations with the philosophy department of Columbia University. Every year, NYU and Columbia philosophy graduate students organize the Annual NYU/Columbia Graduate Student Philosophy Conference. Furthermore, doctoral students are able to cross-register to take courses at Columbia University, as well as at the other members of the Inter-University Doctoral Consortium (IUDC): Princeton University, CUNY Graduate Center, Rutgers University, Fordham University, Stony Brook University, and The New School. Within NYU, the department works especially closely with the School of Law, whose Center for Law and Philosophy hosts the Colloquium in Legal, Political, and Social Philosophy on a weekly basis during the fall semester of each academic year. Many former and current faculty members of the department have held or currently hold dual appointments in both philosophy and law, including Ronald Dworkin, Thomas Nagel, Liam Murphy, Samuel Scheffler, Jeremy Waldron, and Kwame Anthony Appiah. Other research centers affiliated with the department are the Center for Bioethics and the Center for Mind, Brain, and Consciousness.

The department is housed in 5 Washington Place, a historic building within the jurisdiction of the New York City Landmarks Preservation Commission near the border between the neighborhoods of NoHo and Greenwich Village. The interior of the building was completely renovated in 2007 by Steven Holl Architects, featuring design elements inspired by the writings of philosopher Ludwig Wittgenstein, namely his Remarks on Colour.

Gallery of prominent faculty

Current faculty 
This list includes affiliated faculty notable enough to have an individual article in Wikipedia in addition to all regular faculty
Kwame Anthony Appiah, ethics, political philosophy, philosophy of mind, philosophy of race, probability and decision theory
Ned Block, philosophy of mind, philosophy of neuroscience and cognitive science
Paul Boghossian, philosophy of mind, philosophy of language, epistemology
David Chalmers, philosophy of mind, philosophy of language, metaphysics, epistemology
Sanford Diehl, ethics, social and political philosophy
Cian Dorr, metaphysics, epistemology, philosophy of language, philosophy of physics
Hent de Vries, metaphysics, philosophy of religion
Hartry Field, metaphysics, epistemology, philosophy of logic, philosophy of mathematics
Kit Fine, logic, metaphysics, philosophy of language
Laura Franklin-Hall, philosophy of biology
Miranda Fricker, moral philosophy, social epistemology
Jane Friedman, epistemology
Don Garrett, early modern philosophy
Robert Hopkins, aesthetics, philosophy of mind
Paul Horwich, philosophy of language, metaphysics, Wittgenstein, philosophy of science
Dale Jamieson, environmental ethics
Anja Jauernig, Kant, early modern philosophy, 19th and early 20th century German philosophy, history of philosophy of science, aesthetics, and animal ethics
Marko Malink, ancient philosophy, philosophical logic
Matthew Mandelkern, philosophy of language, semantics, philosophy of cognitive science
S. Matthew Liao, bioethics
Tim Maudlin, foundations of physics, metaphysics, logic, philosophy of science
Jessica Moss, ancient philosophy
John Richardson, Heidegger, Nietzsche, ancient philosophy
Samuel Scheffler, moral and political philosophy
Jeff Sebo, bioethics, animal ethics, and environmental ethics
Sharon Street, ethics
Michael Strevens, philosophy of science, concepts, philosophical applications of cognitive science
Peter Unger, metaphysics, epistemology, philosophy of mind, ethics
Daniel Viehoff, political, legal, and moral philosophy
Jeremy Waldron, philosophy of law, social and political philosophy
Crispin Wright, philosophy of language, philosophy of mathematics, metaphysics, epistemology

Emeritus faculty 

 Richard Foley, epistemology
 Frances Kamm, ethics
 Béatrice Longuenesse, Kant, Hegel, modern philosophy, philosophy of mind
 Thomas Nagel, philosophy of mind, philosophy of law, political philosophy, ethics
 William Ruddick, philosophy of science and medicine, professional and applied ethics, bioethics
Stephen Schiffer, philosophy of language, philosophy of mind, metaphysics, epistemology
 J. David Velleman, ethics, moral psychology

Notable former faculty 

 Raziel Abelson,  ethics and ordinary language philosophy
 Margaret Athelton,  early modern period philosophy, philosophy of psychology, feminist philosophy
 William Barrett,  existentialist philosophy
 James Burnham,  political philosophy
 Keith DeRose,  epistemology, philosophy of language, philosophy of religion, and history of modern philosophy
 Ronald Dworkin,  philosophy of law
 Paul Edwards,  ethics
 Sidney Hook,  philosophy of history, philosophy of education, political philosophy, ethics
 Michael Lockwood,  philosophy of mind
 Ferdinand Lundberg,  social philosophy
 Kai Nielson,  metaphilosophy, ethics, social and political philosophy
 Christopher Peacocke, philosophy of mind, epistemology
 James Pryor,  epistemology, philosophy of language
 Theodore Sider,  metaphysics and philosophy of language

Notable former visiting scholars 

 Moshe Halbertal,  Maimonides, ethics, philosophy of religion
 Derek Parfit, identity, philosophy of logic, ethics
 Peter Singer, applied ethics

Notable alumni 

 Ruth Barcan Marcus, philosopher and logician known for the Barcan formula
 Brent Barraclough, classical pianist
 Stanley Bosworth, founding headmaster of Saint Ann's School
 Peter Daou, political strategist and advisor to Hillary Clinton and John Kerry
 Richard Gambino, professor and pioneer of the field of Italian-American studies
 Lewis Frumkes, humorist and writer
 Sandra Harding, philosopher of feminist and postcolonial theory
 Paul Kurtz, philosopher and father of secular humanism
 Tibor Machan, libertarian philosopher
 Walter Ralston Martin, Christian minister and apologist
 Leonard Peikoff, objectivist philosopher and intellectual heir to Ayn Rand
 Shimon Peres, former president and two time prime minister of Israel
 William Reeves, co-founder of BlueCrest Capital Management
 Tim Rollins, artist
 Isaac Rosenfeld, writer
 Harold M. Schulweis, rabbi and theologian
Jeff Sebo, philosopher
 David Sidorsky, philosopher
 Harold Spivake, former Chief of the Music Division of the Library of Congress
 Stephen Yagman, federal lawyer

Other philosophers affiliated with NYU 
The following people are notable philosophers not affiliated with the Department of Philosophy who currently hold or have held faculty positions within other departments at New York University

 Jacques Derrida
Avital Ronell
 Slavoj Žižek

Student organizations 
At the graduate level, students can participate in the NYU chapter of Minorities and Philosophy (MAP), an international organization consisting of philosophy students committed to addressing minority issues in the profession, theoretical issues regarding philosophy of gender, race, sexual orientation, class, disability, native language, etc., and philosophy done from minority perspectives. The MAP chapter at NYU pursues these goals through a variety of events, including talks, film screenings, workshops, trainings, and collaborative events organized with other NYC-area chapters.

At the undergraduate level, students can participate in the NYU Philosophy Forum, which hosts talks and panels with faculty members, postdoctoral fellows, and graduate students throughout the academic year. In addition, the Philosophy Forum organizes the Annual Undergraduate Philosophy Conference @ NYU. The conference is held over two days at the end of the spring semester of each academic year, is open to the public, and consists of undergraduate students selected from various universities giving presentations of their original work on any philosophical topic, panels on philosophical topics of interest, as well as lectures by notable philosophers who are invited from both the faculty at NYU and other institutions. Past keynote lecturers for the conference include Thomas Nagel, David Chalmers, and Saul Kripke, with other notable speakers and panelists including Kwame Anthony Appiah, Ned Block, Paul Boghossian, S. Matthew Liao, Michele Moody-Adams, Sharon Street, and Paul Thagard.

In popular culture 
In the 1989 action film Road House, the main character, James Dalton (played by Patrick Swaze), has a philosophy degree from NYU.

The NYU Department of Philosophy is featured prominently in the 1995 horror film The Addiction. The film's main character, Kathleen Conklin (played by Lili Taylor), is a doctoral candidate in the department who is turned into a vampire after being bitten by a mysterious woman during a chance encounter. Supporting characters include a fellow doctoral candidate (played by Edie Falco) and a faculty member who serves as Kathleen's dissertation advisor (played by Paul Calderón). Other members of the department are shown during a scene at the department's graduation party.

References 

New York University
Philosophy schools
Philosophy departments in the United States

External links